Jacob Moe Rasmussen (born 19 January 1975 in Amager) is a Danish former cyclist.

Major results

1999
1st Stage 2 Vuelta a la Argentina
3rd National Road Race Championships
2000
3rd Overall Guldensporentweedaagse
2004
1st Stage 3 Ringerike GP
2005
1st Colliers Classic
2006
1st Overall Tour du Loir-et-Cher
1st Stages 3, 4 & 5
1st Stages 4 & 5 Ringerike GP
2nd Overall Olympia's Tour
2nd National Road Race Championships
2nd National Time Trial Championships
2007
2nd National Road Race Championships
2008
1st  National Team Time Trial Championships
1st  National Team Pursuit Championships

References

1975 births
Living people
Danish male cyclists